The Bollywood Saga: Indian Cinema is a concise overview of the history of Bollywood. It was written by Dinesh Raheja and Jitendra Kothari, with a foreword by Ismail Merchant, and published in 2004 by Roli Books.

2004 non-fiction books
Hindi cinema